American Airlines Flight 63 (IATA: AA 63; ICAO: AAL63; AMERICAN 63) may refer to several separate events involving a flight with that designation.

 American Airlines Flight 63 (2001), a failed terror attack on December 22, 2001
 American Airlines Flight 63 (Flagship Missouri), a DC-3 that crashed outside of Centerville, Tennessee on October 15, 1943, killing all 11 on board
 American Airlines Flight 63 (Flagship Ohio), a DC-3 that crashed outside of Trammel, Kentucky on July 28, 1943, killing 20 out of 22 on board

See also
 American Airlines accidents and incidents

63
Flight number disambiguation pages